The 1992 Reading Borough Council election was held on 7 May 1992, at the same time as other local elections across England and Scotland, and a month after the general election. One third of Reading Borough Council's 45 seats were up for election.

The only seat which changed parties was in Thames ward, where the official Conservative candidate won the seat back from the independent "Thames Conservative" candidate, Pam Fuad, who had been elected in 1988 as a Conservative but had broken away from the group with her husband, councillor Hamza Fuad, to form the Thames Conservatives in 1990.

Turnout was reported to be 36%.

Results

Ward results
The results in each ward were as follows (candidates with an asterisk* were the previous incumbent standing for re-election):

The Conservatives had planned to field a candidate in Church ward, but the person withdrew just ahead of the deadline for nominations.

The Liberal Democrats had planned to field a candidate in Whitley ward, but an irregularity on his nomination papers meant that he was disqualified.

By-elections 19921994

The Park ward by-election in 1993 was triggered by the resignation of Labour councillor Gillian Parker.

References

1992 English local elections
1992